Edme Bovinet, a French engraver, who was born at Chaumont in 1767, was a pupil of Jean-Baptiste Patas. His works are after the most eminent Italian, Dutch, and French painters; some are in the Galerie du Musée Napoléon. He died at Creil about 1832.

The best of his engravings are:
The Campo Vaccino; after Claude Lorraine.
The Schoolmaster; after Ostade.
Orpheus and Eurydice; after Poussin.

References
 

French engravers
18th-century engravers
19th-century engravers
1767 births
1832 deaths